Asia News may refer to:

Asian News International (ANI), an Indian news agency with 50 bureaus in India
Asia Business News (ABN), a former business news channel of Dow Jones and Company
Asia News Network (ANN), an alliance of 23 news organization across Asia
AsiaNews, an online newsmagazine affiliated with the Roman Catholic Church
Indo-Asian News Service (IANS), the largest private news agency in India
Asia (economic newspaper), a non-governmental Iranian economic news website and newspaper